The Vermont Golden Dome Book Award (formerly the Dorothy Canfield Fisher Children's Book Award) annually recognizes one new American children's book selected by the vote of Vermont schoolchildren. It was inaugurated in 1957.

The award is co-sponsored by the Vermont State PTA and the Vermont Department of Libraries and was originally named after the Vermont writer Dorothy Canfield Fisher. In 2020, it was temporarily renamed the "VT Middle-Grade Book Award" before schoolchildren voted to officially call it the "Vermont Golden Dome Book Award".

Selection process and award
Each spring a committee of eight adults selects a "Master List" of thirty books first published during the previous calendar year. The list is announced at the annual Dorothy Canfield Fisher Conference, usually in May, and is available at Vermont school and public libraries for children who wish to participate over the next eleven months.  The following spring, those children who have read at least five of the thirty books are eligible to vote for the award, with a deadline in mid-April. The award ceremony is scheduled after the end of the school year, usually late June. Thus the award is always for books published two years previously.

The winning writer is invited to visit Vermont to speak with children about the experience of writing for children.

Awards in other categories 

Vermont sponsors two other statewide book awards determined by the votes of younger and older students.

The Red Clover Book Award recognizes a picture book published two years earlier. Voters are children in grades K–4 who have read, or heard read aloud, all 10 books on the list. The Red Clover BA was established by 1997–98, if not earlier, and its 2014 winner was announced by May. It is the centerpiece of a one-day conference in October.

The Green Mountain Book Award is voted by high school students (grades 9–12, routinely ages 14–18) either through a school library or individually online, deadline May 31. Students are asked to vote only once and to read at least 3 from a list of 15 books (for 2014, published 2008–2012; for 2015, published 2011–2013). The Green Mountain BA was inaugurated in 2006.

Winners

One book by a single writer has won the Vermont Golden Dome Book Award every year since 1957.
 2020 Small Spaces by Katherine Arden
 2019 Refugee by Alan Gratz
 2018 Projekt 1065 by Alan Gratz
 2017 The Terrible Two by Jory John & Mac Barnett
 2016 El Deafo by Cece Bell
 2015 Escape from Mr. Lemoncello’s Library' by Chris Grabenstein
 2014 Wonder by R. J. Palacio
 2013 The Running Dream by Wendelin Van Draanen 
 2012 Smile by Raina Telgemeier
 2011 11 Birthdays by Wendy Mass
 2010 The Hunger Games by Suzanne Collins
 2009 Rules by Cynthia Lord
 2008 Diary of a Wimpy Kid by Jeff Kinney
 2007 Flush by Carl Hiaasen
 2006 The Old Willis Place by Mary Downing Hahn
 2005 The Tale of Despereaux by Kate DiCamillo 
 2004 Loser by Jerry Spinelli
 2003 Love That Dog by Sharon Creech
 2002 Because of Winn-Dixie by Kate DiCamillo
 2001 Bud, Not Buddy by Christopher Paul Curtis 
 2000 Holes by Louis Sachar 
 1999 Ella Enchanted by Gail Carson Levine
 1998 Small Steps: The Year I Got Polio by Peg Kehret
 1997 Mick Harte Was Here by Barbara Park
 1996 Time for Andrew by Mary Downing Hahn
 1995 The Boggart by Susan Cooper
 1994 Jennifer Murdley's Toad by Bruce Coville
 1993 Shiloh by Phyllis Reynolds Naylor 
 1992 Maniac Magee by Jerry Spinelli 
 1991 Number the Stars by Lois Lowry 
 1990 Where It Stops, Nobody Knows by Amy Ehrlich
 1989 Hatchet by Gary Paulsen
 1988 Wait Till Helen Comes by Mary Downing Hahn
 1987 The Castle in the Attic by Elizabeth Winthrop
 1986 The War With Grandpa by Robert Kimmel Smith
 1985 Dear Mr. Henshaw by Beverly Cleary 
 1984 A Bundle of Sticks by Pat Rhoades Mauser
 1983 Tiger Eyes by Judy Blume
 1982 The Hand-Me-Down Kid by Francine Pascal
 1981 Bunnicula by James Howe
 1980 Bones on Black Spruce Mountain by David Budbill
 1979 Kid Power by Susan Beth Pfeffer
 1978 Summer of Fear by Lois Duncan
 1977 A Smart Kid Like You by Stella Pevsner
 1976 The Toothpaste Millionaire by Jean Merrill
 1975 The Eighteenth Emergency by Betsy Byars
 1974 Catch a Killer by George Woods
 1973 Never Steal a Magic Cat by Donald E. Caufield
 1972 Flight of the White Wolf by Melvin Ellis
 1971 Go to the Room of the Eyes by B. K. Erwin
 1970 Kavik the Wolf Dog by Walt Morey
 1969 Two in the Wilderness by M. W. Thompson
 1968 The Taste of Spruce Gum by Jacqueline Jackson
 1967 The Summer I Was Lost by Phillip Viereck
 1966 Ribsy by Beverly Cleary
 1965 Rascal by Sterling North
 1964 Bristle Face by Zachary Ball
 1963 The Incredible Journey by Sheila Burnford
 1962 City under the Back Steps by Evelyn Sibley Lampman
 1961 Captain Ghost by Thelma Bell
 1960 Double or Nothing by Phoebe Erickson
 1959 Comanche of the Seventh by Margaret Carver Leighton
 1958 Fifteen by Beverly Cleary
 1957 Old Bones, the Wonder Horse by Mildred Pace

Multiple awards
Several writers have won more than one DCF Award: Beverly Cleary in 1958, 1966, and 1985; Mary Downing Hahn in 1988, 1996, and 2006; Jerry Spinelli and Kate DiCamillo and Alan Gratz twice each.

Seven times from 1985 to 2005, and no others, the schoolchildren selected the winner of the annual Newbery Medal (dated one year earlier, established 1922). That award by the Association for Library Service to Children recognizes the year's "most distinguished contribution to American literature for children". The first agreement of Vermont children with U.S. children's librarians was their 1985 selection of Dear Mr. Henshaw'' by Cleary and there were six more such agreements during the next twenty years to 2005.

Controversy and renaming 

In 2018, there was a call from the Vermont Library Board to change the name of the award to no longer honor Dorothy Canfield Fisher, following a report that she had ties to Vermont's eugenics movement. In April 2019, the Vermont Department of Libraries announced that the award would be renamed in 2020. It was temporarily renamed the "VT Middle-Grade Book Award". In November 2020, it was officially renamed the "Vermont Golden Dome Book Award" after a vote by Vermont elementary school students.

References

External links 
 

American children's literary awards
Awards established in 1957
Vermont education-related lists
Vermont culture